Adelaide has two city ring routes, that loop around the Adelaide city centre and North Adelaide, known as the Inner and Outer Ring Routes.

Inner ring route
The Inner Ring Route is a collection of major roads signposted as state route R1 (was A21 before 2017). Listed clockwise from Main North Road, the inner route consists of:
 Robe Terrace
 Park Road /Mann Road 
 Hackney Road
 Dequetteville Terrace
 Britannia Roundabout
 Fullarton Road
 Greenhill Road
 Richmond Road
 South Road
 James Congdon Drive
 Port Road
 Park Terrace
 Fitzroy Terrace

The Inner Ring Route is adjacent to the outer edge of the Adelaide Park Lands except on the western side between Anzac Highway and Port Road where railway lines occupy the space along the parklands, and the road ring route is further out. The earlier A21 route using West Terrace passed inside the ring of parklands instead.

History
Prior to the renumbering as route R1 in 2017, the western side of the previous route A21 was different from the current route. It followed moore of Port Road southeast, West Terrace and Goodwood Road. Route R1 uses James Congdon Drive, a short section of South Road and Richmond Road instead.

The Park Terrace section had a level crossing of the Outer Harbor railway line until 2017. The crossing was replaced by a bridge when the railway was lowered as part of a project to separate the Torrens Junction so that suburban trains to Outer Harbor did not conflict with interstate trains on the standard gauge line.

The Park Terrace bridge over the Gawler railway line and interstate freight line was constructed in 1990. When it was built, it replaced an awkward 30-degree level crossing.  In 2017, it was named after the engineer who supervised its construction, David Fitzsimons.

Route description

Outer ring route
The Outer Ring Route is not signposted. It also consists of major roads surrounding the city. They are:
 Grand Junction Road
 Hampstead Road/Portrush Road
 Cross Road
 South Road

See also

References

Roads in Adelaide
Ring roads in Australia